The Oruru River is a river of the Northland Region of New Zealand's North Island. It flows north from its sources south of Mangonui to reach the Taipa River  from Taipa.

The New Zealand Ministry for Culture and Heritage gives a translation of "place of the morepork" for Ōruru.

See also
List of rivers of New Zealand

References

Rivers of the Northland Region
Rivers of New Zealand